James Soto Roberts (born 10 January 1992), commonly known as Soto, is a Liberian international footballer who played as a striker in his home country as well for The Lions FC in the Seychelles League. In July 2014, he moved from Liberian club LPRC Oilers to The Lions Fc in the Seychelles League. Soto scored 6 goals in 12 appearances for The Lions FC during the 2014-2015 Season, winning the MVP during the 2008/2009 season in the Liberian Premier League with the Liberia Black Star FC including 2 Championship with Liberia Black Star and LPRC Oilers. Soto represented Liberia Under 23 Team in the 2011  WAFU Nations Cup and was also called up to the Liberia national football team in the 2011/2012 African Cup of Nations. qualifier.

Club career 
Born in Buchanan, Grand Bassa County, Soto started his playing career at Black Star where he won the Liberian Premier League and the Liberian Cup in 2008, he was also the league Top Scorer and MVP that same year, but later moved to  LPRC Oilers.

In July 2014, he moved from LPRC Oilers to The Lions  in the Seychelles League on a one year loan, Soto scored 6 goals in 12 appearances for The Lions FC during the 2014–15 Season.

National team
Soto represented Liberia Under 23 Team in the 2011  WAFU Nations Cup and was also called up to the Liberia national football team in the 2011/2012 African Cup of Nations. qualifier.

Honours

Club 
 Liberia Black Star FC
Winner
 Liberian Premier League: 2007/2008
 Liberian Cup: 2008

Individual 
Winner
 Liberian Premier League: Top Scorer: 2007/2008, 2013/2014
 Liberian Premier League: MVP: 2008

References

External links

1992 births
Living people
Liberian footballers
Monrovia Black Star FC players
LPRC Oilers players
The Lions FC players
People from Buchanan, Liberia
Association football forwards
Liberia international footballers
Liberian expatriate footballers
Expatriate footballers in Seychelles